Tiago Pires may refer to:

 Tiago Pires (footballer) (born 1987), Portuguese footballer
 Tiago Pires (surfer) (born 1980), Portuguese surfer